This article is about the particular significance of the decade 1760 - 1769 to Wales and its people.

Incumbents
Prince of Wales - George (to October 25, 1760) (became George III)
Prince of Wales - George (from 1762) (later George IV)
Princess of Wales - vacant

Events
1760 in Wales
1761 in Wales
1762 in Wales
1763 in Wales
1764 in Wales
1765 in Wales
1766 in Wales
1767 in Wales
1768 in Wales
1769 in Wales

Arts and literature

New books
1762
Thomas Edwards (Twm o'r Nant) - Tri Chydymaith Dyn
Oliver Goldsmith - The Life of Richard Nash
1763
Goronwy Owen et al. - Diddanwch Teuluaidd
1764
Evan Evans (Ieuan Fardd) - Some Specimens of the Poetry of the Antient Welsh Bards
1766
David Jones of Trefriw (ed.) - Cydymaith Diddan
John Roberts (Siôn Robert Lewis) - Drych y Cristion
Anna Williams - Miscellanies in Prose and Verse
1767
Evan Thomas (Ieuan Fardd Ddu) - Traethawd ar Fywyd Ffydd
1768
Thomas Edwards (Twm o'r Nant) - Y Farddoneg Fabilonaidd

Music

Births
1760
6 July - Thomas Phillips, surgeon and educational benefactor (d. 1851)
8 December - Morgan John Rhys, minister and author (d. 1804)
1761
15 July - Walter Davies (Gwallter Mechain), writer (d. 1849)
11 October - David Charles, hymn-writer (d. 1834)
1762
12 August - George, Prince of Wales, later King George IV (d. 1830)
1763
August - Peter Bailey Williams, clergyman and author (d. 1836)
1764
29 April - Julia Ann Hatton, novelist (d. 1838)
20 June - Thomas Evans (Tomos Glyn Cothi), first Unitarian minister in Wales (d. 1833)
date unknown - Robert Waithman, lord mayor of London (d. 1833)
1766
March William Turner, industrialist (d. 1853)
6 December - Robert Williams (Robert ap Gwilym Ddu), poet (d. 1850)
25 December - Christmas Evans, preacher (d. 1838)
1768
August - Sydenham Teak Edwards, botanical artist (d. 1819)
17 September - Edward Lloyd, 1st Baron Mostyn (d. 1854)
24 September - Sharon Turner, historian (d. 1847)

Deaths
1760
April - David Lewis, poet
25 October - King George II of Great Britain, former Prince of Wales, 76
1761
8 April - Griffith Jones Llanddowror, pioneer in education, 77
1762
3 February - Beau Nash, leader of fashion, 87
1763
25 November - Richard Morris, father of the noted Morris brothers ("Morrisiaid Môn"), 89
1764
18 June - Christmas Samuel, minister and writer, 90
22 June - Sir John Philipps, 6th Baronet, 63
26 September - Joseph Harris, Assay-master of the Royal Mint, 60
1765
10 April - Edward Heylyn, porcelain manufacturer, 70?
11 April - Lewis Morris, hydrographer and writer, eldest of the Morris brothers of Anglesey, 64
1767
11 September - Theophilus Evans, clergyman and historian, 74
17 September - Prince Edward, Duke of York and Albany, second son of Frederick, Prince of Wales, 28
1768
26 March - Humphrey Owen, academic, 65
1769
July - Goronwy Owen, poet, 46

 
18th century in Wales
Wales
Wales
Decades in Wales